Teresa S. Pierce is an American politician from Maine. Pierce, a Democrat from Falmouth, Maine, has served in the Maine House of Representatives since December 2014.

Prior to serving in the Legislature, Pierce served for nine years (three terms) on the Falmouth Town Council.

References

Year of birth missing (living people)
Living people
People from Falmouth, Maine
University of Colorado Boulder alumni
Democratic Party members of the Maine House of Representatives
Maine city council members
Women state legislators in Maine
Place of birth missing (living people)
Women city councillors in Maine
21st-century American politicians
21st-century American women politicians